Durnevskaya is a rural locality (a village) in Tarnogskoye Rural Settlement, Tarnogsky District, Vologda Oblast, Russia. The population was five, as of 2002.

Geography 
Durnevskaya is located 29 km northeast of Tarnogsky Gorodok (the district's administrative centre) by road. Pavlomatveyevskaya is the nearest rural locality.

References 

Rural localities in Tarnogsky District